SMS G194 was a S-138-class large torpedo boat of the Imperial German Navy. She was built by the Germaniawerft shipyard at Kiel between 1910 and 1911, and was launched on 25 May 1911, entering service later that year. She served throughout the First World War, taking part in the Battle of Heligoland Bight on 28 August 1914. She was rammed and sunk by the British light cruiser  on 26 March 1916.

Construction and design
The Imperial German Navy ordered 12 large torpedo boats (Große Torpedoboote) as part of the fiscal year 1910 shipbuilding programme, with one half-flotilla of six ships ordered from Germaniawerft and the other six ships from AG Vulcan. The two groups of torpedo boats were of basically similar layout but differed slightly in detailed design, with a gradual evolution of design and increase in displacement with each year's orders.

The ship was armed with two 8.8 cm L/45 guns, one on the Forecastle and one aft. Four single 50 cm (19.7 in) torpedo tubes were fitted, with two on the ship's beam in the gap between the forecastle and the ship's bridge which were capable of firing straight ahead, one between the ship's two funnels, and one aft of the funnels. The ship had a crew of 84 officers and men.

G194 was laid down at Germaniawerft's Kiel shipyard as Yard number 153 and was launched on 12 January 1911 and completed on 2 August 1911.

Service
On commissioning, G194 joined the 2nd Half Flotilla of the 1st Torpedo Flotilla, and remained part of the 2nd Half Flotilla in 1914.

On 28 August 1914, the  British Harwich Force, supported by light cruisers and battlecruisers of the Grand Fleet, carried out  a raid towards Heligoland with the intention of destroying patrolling German torpedo boats. Four German light cruisers and another flotilla of torpedo boats (the 5th Torpedo Boat Flotilla) was in the vicinity of Heligoland. G194, a member of the 2nd Half Flotilla of the 1st Torpedo Flotilla, formed part of the outer screen of torpedo boats.

At about 06:00 on 28 August, G194 spotted the periscope of the British submarine , one of three submarines deployed as bait to lure the German torpedo boats away from Heligoland. Shortly afterwards E7 fired a torpedo at G194 which missed. G194 reported by radio her encounter with the British submarine to Rear Admiral Leberecht Maass, the commander of the German torpedo boat forces, aboard the cruiser  back at Wilhelmshaven. As a result of this report, the 5th Torpedo Boat Flotilla was ordered out to hunt the hostile submarine.

The Torpedo boat , leader of the 1st Flotilla, trying to return to Heligoland on hearing gunfire, ran into the midst of the Harwich force and was sunk. G194 was undamaged.

In August 1915 the Germans detached a large portion of the High Seas Fleet for operations in the Gulf of Riga in support of the advance of German troops. It was planned to enter the Gulf via the Irbe Strait, defeating any Russian naval forces and mining the entrance to Moon Sound. G194 was deployed in support of these operations.

On 25 March 1916, the British seaplane carrier , escorted by the Harwich force, launched an air attack against a Zeppelin base believed to be at Hoyer on the coast of Schleswig. The raid was a failure, with the airship base actually at Tondern, and the British destroyer  was rammed by the destroyer . Forces of the High Seas Fleet went to sea in response to the air raid, and German torpedo boats were ordered to search for Medusa, which had been slowly towed towards home in poor weather, but unknown to the Germans, had later been abandoned. During the night of 25/26 March,  and G194 suddenly encountered units of the Harwich force. The light cruiser  rammed G194, cutting the torpedo boat in two and sinking her, killing all 93 of G194s crew. In doing so, Cleopatra cut across the bows of the cruiser , which rammed Cleopatra, damaging both cruisers.

References

Torpedo boats of the Imperial German Navy
World War I torpedo boats of Germany
Ships built in Kiel
1911 ships